Alec George Blakeman (11 June 1918 – November 1994) was an English professional footballer who played in the Football League for Brentford, Sheffield United and Bournemouth as an inside forward.

Personal life 
Blakeman spent four years in a German prisoner of war camp during the Second World War.

Career statistics

References

External links
 

English footballers
English Football League players
Brentford F.C. players
1918 births
1994 deaths
Oxford City F.C. players
Sheffield United F.C. players
AFC Bournemouth players
March Town United F.C. players
Wycombe Wanderers F.C. players
Association football inside forwards
British military personnel of World War II
World War II prisoners of war held by Germany
British World War II prisoners of war